The 1978 German Formula Three Championship was a multi-event motor racing championship for single-seat open wheel formula racing cars held across Europe. The championship featured drivers competing in two-litre Formula Three racing cars which conformed to the technical regulations, or formula, for the championship. It commenced on 12 March at Circuit Zolder and ended at Erding on 1 October after nine rounds.

Klaus Zimmermann Racing Team driver Bertram Schäfer became a champion. He won races at Zolder, Nürburgring and Wunstorf. Alan Smith finished as runner-up, he was consistent but wasn't able to win a race. The same was true for Helmut Bross, who completed the top-three in the drivers' standings. Jochen Dauer, Michael Korten and Walter Lechner were the only other drivers who were able to win a race in the season.

Calendar
All rounds were held in West Germany, excepting Zolder rounds that were held in Belgium.

Championship standings
Points are awarded as follows:

References

External links
 

German Formula Three Championship seasons
Formula Three season